Nam is a Korean family name meaning "south". The 2000 South Korean census found 257,178 people with this family name, of whom 150,394 belonged to the Uiryeong Nam bon-gwan. According to the same census, the place with the highest frequency of people belonging to that bon-gwan was Eumseong County, North Chungcheong Province, where it accounted for 1,021 people, or 1.21% of the population; this represented a significant drop both in numbers and in proportion from the 1985 census, when it accounted for 1,427 people, or 1.71% of the population.

Korean people with this surname include:
Nam Bo-ra (born 1989), South Korean actress
Nam Da-reum (born 2002), South Korean actor
Nam Da-won (born 1997), South Korean singer, member of girl group Cosmic Girls
Nam Gi-nam (born 1942), South Korean director of movies, cartoons and TV series
Nam Gyu-ri (born 1985), South Korean singer, former member of girl group SeeYa
Nam Hae-il (born 1948), South Korean naval officer
Nam Hyun-hee (born 1981), South Korean foil fencer
Nam Ji-hyun (actress) (born 1995), South Korean actress
Nam Ji-hyun (singer) (born 1990), South Korean singer, former member of girl group 4Minute
Nam Joo-hyuk (born 1994), South Korean actor and model 
Nam Jung-hyun (born 1933), South Korean author
Nam Na-yeong (born 1971), South Korean film editor
Nam Sang-mi (born 1984), South Korean actress
Nam Sung-yong (1912–2001), Korean Olympian
Nam Tae-hee (born 1991), South Korean football player
Nam Tae-hyun (born 1994), South Korean singer, former member of boy group Winner
Nam Woo-hyun (born 1991), South Korean singer, member of boy group Infinite
Nam Yoon-ho (born 1984), South Korean curler
Eric Nam (born 1988), Korean-American singer
Leonardo Nam (born 1979), Korean Australian actor
Naomi Nari Nam (born 1985), American figure skater

See also
A number of Korean given names also contain the same character "nam" meaning south, or another identically pronounced one (男) meaning "man":

 Gi-nam
 Jung-nam
 Nam-gi
 Nam-il
 Nam-seon
 Nam-sun
 Sung-nam
 Young-nam

References

External links
 Page for Nam on surname.info

Korean-language surnames